The Üsenberg Castle was a ruined hill castle near the city of Breisach in the Breisgau-Hochschwarzwald district of Baden-Württemberg, Germany.

History 
It was located just north of the emerging town of Breisach. The information about its destruction are unclear and contradictory. The castle was possibly destroyed by the inhabitants of Breisach in the 1240s. As a replacement, the lords of Üsenberg obtained the Höhingen Castle near Achkarren. In 1291, the Üsenberg Castle was considered a Burgstall. In 1320, the lords of Üsenberg sold the lot of the former castle to the city inhabitants.

There are no remains of the former castle.

References

Bibliography

External links 
 

Former castles in Germany
Hill castles
11th-century establishments in the Holy Roman Empire
Buildings and structures completed in the 11th century